Stunts Unlimited may refer to:

Stunts Unlimited (stunt team), formed by Hal Needham, Glenn Wilder, and Ronnie Rondell in 1970
Stunts Unlimited (film), 1980 film about stunt performers directed by Hal Needham